The Construction Clients' Group is a United Kingdom construction organisation representing major clients of the construction industry. It represents the views of clients to the Strategic Forum for Construction and other major industry forums.

Its members includes public and private sector organisations such as Highways England, Land Securities, Heathrow Airport, Department of Health and London Underground, responsible for significant annual investment in construction projects.

History
In 1994, a group of industry clients formed a lobbying organisation, the Construction Clients' Forum, which later became the Confederation of Construction Clients. In 2004, it took on its current name, and was part of the British Property Federation. In 2011 it was agreed to position the Construction Clients’ Group within Constructing Excellence, while maintaining its independent status.

References

External links
 Construction Clients' Group web page

Construction trade groups based in the United Kingdom
Building